Compañeros may refer to.
 Compañeros (film), 1970 Zapata Western film directed by Sergio Corbucci.
 Compañeros (TV series), Spanish television series aired from 1998 to 2002.